The 2000 Team China Four Nations Tournament was the inaugural edition of the Four Nations Tournament, an official international football tournament hosted by the Chinese Football Association and International Sport and Leisure (ISL). It was held from 14 to 16 January 2000 in Guangzhou, China.

Participants 
The original participants for the tournament were China, New Zealand, South Korea and Yugoslavia. Uruguay and Jamaica accept the invitation after South Korea and Yugoslavia quit in December 1999.

  (host)

Venues

Matches 
All times are local, CST (UTC+8).

Bracket

Semi-finals

Third-place playoff

Final

Statistics

Goalscorers

References 

Four Nations Tournament (China)
2000 in association football
Sports competitions in Guangzhou
2000 in Chinese football
January 2000 sports events in Asia
International association football competitions hosted by China
Football in Guangzhou